Panagia tou Kastrou, also known as Our Lady of the Castle is a medieval Greek Orthodox church in the city of Rhodes, in Rhodes, Greece. It is located inside the old walled city, and it is the largest surviving Byzantine church of the island. It has historically served as a Roman Catholic church and a Muslim mosque throughout its history as Rhodes was conquered by various states and empires.

History 

Panagia tou Kastrou was built as a Greek Orthodox church around the eleventh century.

After the capture of Rhodes by the Knights Hospitaller, the Byzantine Orthodox church was converted into a Roman Catholic church and archiepiscopal cathedral of the Latins, also dedicated to Virgin Mary, under the name Sancta Maria Castelli Rodi.

The Byzantine church was remodeled sometime in the first half of the 14th century; this was likely is due to a repair due to the possible collapse of the middle nave with the dome during the earthquake of 1303. The archdiocese of Rhodes was in great poverty at the time, and could not afford the reconstruction of the church. Thus the help of Pope John XXII was asked, who seems to have provided funds for the church. In honour of his contribution they placed his coat of arms next to that of the Hospitaller Grand Master Hélion de Villeneuve.

The church seems to have obtained yet another intervention by the Knights, which is dated around the second half of the 15th century and is probably connected to the siege of 1480, during which Panagia tou Kastrou suffered extensive damage. Supporting this dating is the coat of arms of Grand Master Pierre d'Aubusson (1476-1503) within a glass case, accompanied by the coats of arms of earlier Grand Masters, Antoni de Fluvian and Jean Bonpart de Lastic, as tribute, apparently for their contributions to restorations.

After the island fell to the Ottomans Turks in 1522, it was converted into a mosque, called Enderum Mosque and it remained so until World War II, where the portico and the minaret were removed by the Italians who held Rhodes at the time and it was converted back into a Christian church.

Architecture 

It is the oldest and largest surviving Byzantine church inside the medieval town of Rhodes.

The church of Panagia tou Kastrou is located at the eastern end of Hippoton Street (Street of the Knights), in the Kollakio of the medieval city, near the seaport. The original core of the building was a cruciform inscribed with dome type; this architectural style is evident until approximately the genesis of arches. After the capture of Rhodes by the Knights Hospitaller, the Byzantine church was remodeled and took the form of a three-aisled Gothic basilica with a transversal aisle.

The eastern side of the temple adjoins the sea fortification and is formed externally into a tower with rectangular ramparts. On the west side, above the central entrance door, a large rectangular frame is preserved, which would have housed a painted composition, that is now lost, with the subject of Virgin Mary surrounded by saints and knights.

During the period of Ottoman Turkish rule on the island and its conversion to a mosque, a portico was built and a minaret was erected on the south side for its new function as a mosque for Islamic worship; both elements were later removed by the Italians during the restoration works. A fountain dating to 1881 was also added in the courtyard outside the church.

Few traces of the church's painted decoration remain. A mural depicting Virgin Mary with the Child and a pair of saints is found on the north-west dome-supporting column (around the second quarter of the fourteenth century) and the figure of Saint Lucia on the southern wall, probably the work of some Western European painter (around the second half of the fourteenth century).

Gallery

See also 
 Byzantine architecture
 Conversion of non-Islamic places of worship into mosques

References

External links 
 

Buildings and structures in Rhodes (city)
Former mosques in Greece
Mosques converted from churches in Ottoman Greece
11th-century architecture in Greece
11th-century churches
Rhodes under the Knights Hospitaller
Eastern Orthodox church buildings in Greece
Gothic architecture in Greece
Medieval sites in Greece
Tourist attractions in the South Aegean
Basilica churches in Greece
Buildings converted to Catholic church buildings